Lewis Warren Shurtliff (July 24, 1835 – May 2, 1922) was a Utah politician and a missionary and leader in the Church of Jesus Christ of Latter-day Saints (LDS Church).

Shurtliff was born in Sullivan, Ohio. As an infant, his parents joined the Church of Jesus Christ of Latter-day Saints; the family followed Joseph Smith to Kirtland, Ohio; Far West, Missouri; and Nauvoo, Illinois. In 1851, the Shurtliff family travelled to Utah Territory as Mormon pioneers and settled in Weber County.

In 1855 to 1858, Shurliff was a Mormon missionary to the Native Americans in present-day Salmon River, Idaho.  In 1867, he went on a mission to England, Scotland, Wales, Denmark, Norway, Sweden, Germany, France, and Italy.

Shurliff returned to Utah Territory and became the LDS Church Bishop in Plain City. In 1883, he became the president of the church's Weber Stake, which was based on Ogden. Also in 1883, Shurliff was invited to join the church's Council of Fifty.

In 1886 and 1888, Shurliff was elected to the Utah Territorial Council. After Utah gained statehood in 1896, Shurliff was a State Senator from 1896 to 1899. He was initially elected as a Democrat but later became a Republican. Shurliff also served as a Weber County Commissioner and as a Weber County probate judge. In 1904 Shurtliff served as the 1st Vice president of the 12th National Irrigation Congress.

In 1896, the Utah settlement of Salt Creek was renamed Warren to honor Shurtliff.

Shurliff died in Ogden, Utah. One of Shurtliff's daughters, Louie Emily Shurtliff, married Joseph Fielding Smith, who after her death went on to become an apostle and later the President of the LDS Church.

Notes

References
Andrew Jenson. Latter-day Saints' Biographical Encyclopedia (Deseret News: Salt Lake City, 1901) 1:459–460.

External links
State of Utah Death Certificate.

1835 births
1922 deaths
19th-century Mormon missionaries
American leaders of the Church of Jesus Christ of Latter-day Saints
American Mormon missionaries in the United States
Members of the Utah Territorial Legislature
19th-century American politicians
Mormon missionaries in Wales
American Mormon missionaries in England
American Mormon missionaries in France
American Mormon missionaries in Italy
American Mormon missionaries in Denmark
American Mormon missionaries in Sweden
American Mormon missionaries in Norway
American Mormon missionaries in Germany
American Mormon missionaries in Scotland
American Mormon missionaries in the United Kingdom
County commissioners in Utah
Mormon pioneers
People from Plain City, Utah
Utah Democrats
Utah Republicans
Utah state senators
Utah state court judges
People from Ashland County, Ohio